Cyrtocarpa is a genus of trees in the subfamily Spondiadoideae of the cashew and sumac family Anacardiaceae. Their habitat is dry forests to open arid areas. They grow naturally in Mexico and northern South America.

Species
The Plant List and Catalogue of Life recognise 5 accepted species:
 Cyrtocarpa caatingae 
 Cyrtocarpa edulis 
 Cyrtocarpa kruseana 
 Cyrtocarpa procera 
 Cyrtocarpa velutinifolia

References

 
Anacardiaceae genera